Toghtua Bukha (Toγtoγa Buqa; died 1376) was a Goryeo royal family member as the grandson of Wang Go who became the King Shen(Sim) of Yang in the fourteenth century. He was a competitor to King Gongmin who competed for the Goryeo throne.

He became an elite imperial bodyguard of Toghun Temür in 1350 and held a high position in the Yuan court. After his grandfather died, he succeeded his grandfather's position as the King Shen/Sim of Yang in 1354.

Empress Öljei Khutugh and her son, Crown Prince Ayushiridara tried to replace Gongmin of Goryeo because he had exterminated the Ki family in 1356. They tried to install Toghtua Bukha, but was declined. Toghtua Bukha expected Goryeo to welcome him as king's death because the king had no legitimate son.

The Yuan Dynasty was expelled from China by the new Ming Dynasty in 1368 and King Gongmin kept pro-Ming policies. His assassination in 1374 reignited the race for successor. Yi Inim's faction finally installed King U but the Yuan Dynasty in Mongolia attempted to appoint Toghtua Bukha. An Sagi (安師琦) also supported him in Goryeo and asked him to return to Goryeo. This group was, however, destroyed by the mainstream faction in 1374. Toghtua Bukha's activity during this strife is almost unknown, but he seems to stayed in Naghachu's camp in Manchuria and watched for a chance. After his death, the position of King Shen of Yang was abolished since the Yuan dynasty was ended.

See also	 
 History of Korea
 History of China

Korean royalty
14th-century Korean monarchs
Mongolian people of Korean descent
Korean people of Mongolian descent